The Skia Graphics Engine or Skia is an open-source 2D graphics library written in C++. Skia abstracts away platform-specific graphics API (which differ from one to another). Skia Inc. originally developed the library; Google acquired it in 2005, and then released the software as open source licensed under the New BSD free software license in 2008.

Overview
In order to stay multi-platform Skia supports several (platform-dependent) back-ends. These include:

 CPU software rasterization
 Portable Document Format (PDF) output
 GPU-accelerated rendering by using:
 ANGLE backed which translates OpenGL ES calls into vendor's native APIs
 Vulkan, and Metal.

 Scalable Vector Graphics (SVG)
 XPS

Skia is most similar in purpose to Cairo or Pathfinder (meaning that it focuses on drawing) rather than to other more elaborate APIs like that one of Qt that provide their own widgets and UI description language etc.

Application 
The library is used  in Google Chrome, ChromeOS, ChromiumOS, Mozilla Firefox, Mozilla Thunderbird, Android, Firefox OS, LibreOffice (from version 7.0), Flutter and Avalonia (from Alpha 4).

The Skia library is also present on the BlackBerry PlayBook, though the extent of its usage is unclear.

Supported platforms 

 Windows 7, 8, 8.1, 10
 macOS 10.10.5 or later
 iOS 8 or later
 Android 4.1 (JellyBean) or later
 Ubuntu 14.04+, Debian 8+, openSUSE 13.3+, or Fedora Linux 24+
 Web Browsers

History 
Skia Inc, developers of the Skia Graphics Engine, was founded in 2004 by Mike Reed and Cary Clark in Chapel Hill North Carolina, before being acquired by Google in 2005.

See also 
 Direct2D
 Starling Framework
 Anti-Grain Geometry
 CoreGraphics
 Cairo
QuickDraw GX

References

External links 
 
Skia & Freetype – Android 2D Graphics Essentials
 Pathfinder 3

YouTube 
 
Google Developers: Painting in Chromium, 2012 on YouTube

Google acquisitions
Graphics libraries
Software using the BSD license